4,4'-diapophytoene synthase (dehydrosqualene synthase, DAP synthase, C30 carotene synthase, CrtM) is an enzyme with systematic name farnesyl-diphosphate:farnesyl-diphosphate farnesyltransferase (4,4'-diapophytoene forming). This enzyme catalyses the following chemical reaction

 2 (2E,6E)-farnesyl diphosphate  4,4'-diapophytoene + 2 diphosphate (overall reaction)
 (1a) 2 (2E,6E)-farnesyl diphosphate  diphosphate + presqualene diphosphate
 (1b) presqualene diphosphate  4,4'-diapophytoene + diphosphate

This enzyme requires Mn2+. It is present in Staphylococcus aureus and some other bacteria such as Heliobacillus sp.

References

External links 
 

EC 2.5.1